Aixirivall is a village in Andorra, located in the southwestern part of the country near the Spanish border, in the parish of Sant Julià de Lòria.

Populated places in Andorra
Sant Julià de Lòria